Inland Empire is a 2006 experimental psychological thriller film written, directed and co-produced by David Lynch. The film's cinematography, editing, score and sound design were also by Lynch, with pieces by a variety of other musicians also featured. Lynch's longtime collaborator and then-wife Mary Sweeney co-produced the film. The cast includes such Lynch regulars as Laura Dern, Justin Theroux, Harry Dean Stanton, and Grace Zabriskie, as well as Jeremy Irons, Karolina Gruszka, Peter J. Lucas, Krzysztof Majchrzak, and Julia Ormond. There are also brief appearances by a host of additional actors, including Nastassja Kinski, Laura Harring, Terry Crews, Mary Steenburgen, and William H. Macy. The voices of Harring, Naomi Watts, and Scott Coffey are included in excerpts from Lynch's 2002 Rabbits online project. The title borrows its name from a metropolitan area in Southern California.

Released with the tagline "A Woman in Trouble", the film follows the fragmented and nightmarish events surrounding a Hollywood actress (Laura Dern) who begins to take on the personality of a character she plays in a supposedly cursed film production. An international co-production between the United States, France, and Poland, the film was completed over a three-year period and shot primarily in Los Angeles and Poland. The process marked several firsts for Lynch: the film was shot without a finished screenplay, instead being largely developed on a scene-by-scene basis; and it was shot entirely in low-resolution digital video by Lynch himself using a handheld Sony camcorder rather than traditional film stock.

Inland Empire premiered in Italy at the Venice Film Festival on 6 September 2006. It received generally positive but polarized reviews from critics, with attention centering on its challenging and surrealist elements. It was named the second-best film of 2007 (tied with two others) by Cahiers du cinéma, and listed among Sight & Sounds "thirty best films of the 2000s", as well as The Guardians "10 most underrated movies of the decade".

The film was remastered by Lynch and Janus Films in 2022.

Plot
In a hotel room, the Lost Girl—a young prostitute—cries following an unpleasant encounter with a client while watching a television show about a family of surrealistic anthropomorphic rabbits who speak in cryptic statements and questions.

Meanwhile in Los Angeles, actress Nikki Grace auditions for the lead role in the film, On High in Blue Tomorrows. In her mansion, she is visited by a neighbor, who asks about the film and then tells "an old tale": a boy passed through the doorway into the world, causing a reflection that gave birth to evil that followed him. Then she tells a variation: a girl was lost in the marketplace "as if half-born" while the alley behind the marketplace was the way to the palace. The woman is certain that Nikki will get the role, and insists, despite Nikki's claims to the contrary, that the plot involves murder. The next day, Nikki celebrates having won the role as her Polish husband Piotrek watches on.

During the first rehearsal involving Nikki and the film's lead actor Devon, the actors are interrupted by a disturbance on the set. Devon investigates, but finds nothing. Shaken by the event, director Kingsley Stewart confesses that they are shooting a remake of a German film entitled 47, based on a Polish folk-tale. Production was abandoned after both leads were murdered, creating rumors of the film being cursed.

After filming the first few romantic scenes between their respective characters Sue and Billy, Nikki and Devon begin an affair, despite earlier protestations that their relationship would be strictly professional and despite Piotrek warning Devon of "dark consequences" for "wrong actions". Nikki starts to have difficulties distinguishing between real life and scenes from the film. Entering a door marked "Axxon N." in an alley, she finds herself walking onto the set and causing the disturbance during the first rehearsal weeks earlier. Nikki runs away and enters a prop, which turns into an actual house. Inside the house, Nikki sees her husband going to bed. She hides from him in a closet, where she encounters a troupe of prostitutes.

At this point, various plotlines and scenes begin to entwine and complement each other, with the chronological order and the distinction between characters unclear. Some scenes show her joining the (modern-day) prostitutes, while other scenes depicts prostitutes and pimps in a wintery Łódź in the 1930s. She is also shown to live a troubled marriage with her poor husband "Smithy". In another set of scenes, Nikki/Sue is talking to a policeman in a room above a nightclub. She tells him how she was sexually abused in her childhood and how her husband joined a traveling circus from Poland as a gamekeeper. She also speaks of the Phantom, a hypnotist who worked at the circus and then disappeared.

In one scene, Sue confronts Billy in front of his family, professing her love. She is sent away and slapped by Billy's wife Doris. It is now revealed that Doris was the woman who earlier told a policeman that she had been hypnotized to kill someone and found a screwdriver sticking in her own stomach. Doris remembers that the Phantom hypnotized her to kill Sue.

Feeling stalked by the Phantom, Nikki/Sue arms herself with a screwdriver. Walking down Hollywood Boulevard she notices her doppelgänger and Doris and meets with the policeman above the nightclub. Outside, she is eventually stabbed by Doris with her own screwdriver. Nikki/Sue collapses at a bus stop next to two homeless women. One tells all kinds of strange stories about her friend Niko, while the other holds a lighter in front of Sue's face until she dies. Kingsley yells "Cut!" and the camera pans back to show this has merely been a film scene.

Kingsley informs Nikki that her scenes for the film are complete. In a daze, Nikki wanders off set and into a nearby cinema, where she sees not only On High in Blue Tomorrows but events that are occurring in real-time. She follows a man upstairs and enters an apartment marked "Axxon N". Confronted by the Phantom, Nikki shoots him. The Phantom transforms into a grotesque figure before dying. Nikki flees into Room 47, which houses the rabbits on television - though she fails to see them - and then meets the Lost Girl. The Lost Girl escapes from the hotel and into Smithy's house, where she happily embraces her husband and son. Nikki is back at her mansion.

The film ends with a celebration involving the troupe of prostitutes, a one-legged woman mentioned earlier, Niko and her pet monkey and others. The women dance to Nina Simone's "Sinner Man", while a lumberjack saws a log to the beat.

Cast
 Laura Dern as Nikki Grace / Sue Blue
 Jeremy Irons as Kingsley Stewart
 Justin Theroux as Devon Berk / Billy Side
 Harry Dean Stanton as Freddie Howard
 Julia Ormond as Doris Side
 Diane Ladd as Marilyn Levens
 Peter J. Lucas as Piotrek Krol / Smithy
 Grace Zabriskie as Visitor #1
 Mary Steenburgen as Visitor #2
 Karolina Gruszka as Lost Girl
 Krzysztof Majchrzak as Phantom
 Ian Abercrombie as Henry, The Butler
 Nae as Street Woman
 Terry Crews as Street Man
 William H. Macy as The Announcer
 Tracy Ashton as Marine's Sister
 Leon Niemczyk as Marek
 Jan Hencz as Janek
 Jordan Ladd as Terri
 Laura Harring as Jane Rabbit / Party Guest
 Scott Coffey as Jack Rabbit
 Naomi Watts as Suzie Rabbit
 David Lynch (voice) as Bucky, The Gaffer
 Nastassja Kinski as The Lady
 Dominique Vandenberg as Trainyard Worker
 Ben Harper as Piano Player (uncredited)

Development

Production
Inland Empire is the first Lynch feature to be completely shot in digital video; it was shot in standard definition with a hand-held Sony DSR-PD150 by Lynch himself. Lynch has stated that he will no longer use film to make motion pictures. He explained his preference, stating that the medium gives one "more room to dream", and more options in post-production. Much of the project was shot in Łódź, Poland, with local actors, such as Karolina Gruszka, Krzysztof Majchrzak, Leon Niemczyk, Piotr Andrzejewski and artists of the local circus Cyrk Zalewski. Some videography was also done in Los Angeles, and in 2006 Lynch returned from Poland to complete filming. Lynch then edited the final results in Final Cut Pro in his home office over six months. He did not work with frequent collaborator and editor Mary Sweeney because "there wasn't a real organized script to go by and no one knew what was going on except him."

Lynch shot the film without a complete screenplay. Instead, he handed each actor several pages of freshly written dialogue each day. In a 2005 interview, he described his feelings about the shooting process:
"I've never worked on a project in this way before. I don't know exactly how this thing will finally unfold ... This film is very different because I don't have a script. I write the thing scene by scene and much of it is shot and I don't have much of a clue where it will end. It's a risk, but I have this feeling that because all things are unified, this idea over here in that room will somehow relate to that idea over there in the pink room."

Interviewed at the Venice Film Festival, Laura Dern admitted that she did not know what Inland Empire was about or the role she was playing, but hoped that seeing the film's premiere at the festival would help her "learn more". Justin Theroux has also stated that he "couldn't possibly tell you what the film's about, and at this point I don't know that David Lynch could. It's become sort of a pastime—Laura [Dern] and I sit around on set trying to figure out what's going on." In an NPR interview, Dern recounted a conversation she had with one of the movie's new producers, Jeremy Alter. He asked if Lynch was joking when he requested a one-legged woman, a monkey and a lumberjack by 3:15. "Yeah, you're on a David Lynch movie, dude," Dern replied. "Sit back and enjoy the ride." Dern reported that by 4 p.m. they were shooting with the requested individuals.

Financing and distribution
Lynch financed much of the production from his own resources, with longtime artistic collaborator and ex-wife Mary Sweeney producing. The film was also partially financed by the French production company StudioCanal, which had provided funding for three previous Lynch films. StudioCanal wanted to enter the film in the 2006 Cannes Film Festival. Instead, it premiered at Italy's Venice Film Festival on 6 September 2006, where David Lynch also received the Golden Lion lifetime achievement award for his "contributions to the art of cinema". The film premiered in the United States on 8 October 2006 at the New York Film Festival. The film received a limited release in the US beginning on 15 December 2006; distribution was handled by the specialist company 518 Media.

Lynch hoped to distribute the film independently, saying that with the entire industry changing, he thought he would attempt a new form of distribution as well. He acquired the rights to the DVD and worked out a deal with StudioCanal in an arrangement that allowed him to distribute the film himself, through both digital and traditional means. A North American DVD release occurred on 14 August 2007. Among other special features, the DVD included a 75-minute featurette, "More Things That Happened", which compiled footage elaborating on Sue's marriage to Smithy, her unpleasant life story, the Phantom's influence on women, and the lives of the prostitutes on Hollywood Boulevard. 15 years after the North American DVD release, The Criterion Collection announced a 2 disc Blu-ray that was scheduled to release on 21 March 2022.

Soundtrack

Lynch contributed a number of his own compositions to the film's soundtrack, marking a departure from his frequent collaborations with composer Angelo Badalamenti. His pieces range from minimalist ambient music to more pop-oriented tracks such as "Ghost of Love". Polish composer Marek Zebrowski wrote music for the film, and acted as music consultant. The soundtrack includes the following musical pieces:

David Lynch – "Ghost of Love" (5:30)
David Lynch – "Rabbits Theme" (0:59)
Mantovani – "Colors of My Life" (3:50)
David Lynch – "Woods Variation" (12:19)
Dave Brubeck – "Three to Get Ready" (5:22)
Boguslaw Schaeffer – "Klavier Konzert" (5:26)
Kroke – "The Secrets of the Life Tree" (3:27)
Little Eva – "The Locomotion" (2:24)
David Lynch – "Call from the Past" (2:58)
Krzysztof Penderecki – "Als Jakob erwachte" (7:27)
Witold Lutoslawski – "Novelette Conclusion" (excerpt) / Joey Altruda – "Lisa" (edit) (3:42)
Beck – "Black Tambourine" (film version) (2:47)
David Lynch – "Mansion Theme" (2:18)
David Lynch – "Walkin' on the Sky" (4:04)
David Lynch / Marek Zebrowski – "Polish Night Music No. 1" (4:18)
David Lynch / Chrysta Bell – "Polish Poem" (5:55)
Nina Simone – "Sinnerman" (edit) (6:40)

Themes and analysis

When asked about Inland Empire, Lynch refrained from explaining the film, responding that it is "about a woman in trouble, and it's a mystery, and that's all I want to say about it." When presenting screenings of the digital work, Lynch sometimes offers a clue in the form of a quotation from the Brihadaranyaka Upanishad:

We are like the spider. We weave our life and then move along in it. We are like the dreamer who dreams and then lives in the dream. This is true for the entire universe.

New York Film Festival official Richard Peña summarized the film as "a plotless collection of snippets that explore themes Lynch has been working on for years", including "a Hollywood story about a young actress who gets a part in a film that might be cursed; a story about the smuggling of women from Eastern Europe; and an abstract story about a family of people with rabbit heads sitting around in a living room." The Guardian critic Peter Bradshaw called the film "a meditation on the unacknowledged and unnoticed strangeness of Hollywood and movie-making in general", adding that Lynch "establishes a bizarre series of worm-holes between the worlds of myth, movies and reality." Critic Mark Fisher wrote that the film "often seems like a series of dream sequences floating free of any grounding reality, a dream without a dreamer [in which] no frame is secure", but argued that "it is the film that is mad, not the characters in it ... it is Hollywood itself that is dreaming". He also commented that "to see Lynch's worlds captured on digital video makes for a bizarre short-circuiting: as if we are witnessing a direct feed from the unconscious".

Dennis Lim of Slate described the film as "a three-hour waking nightmare that derives both its form and its content from the splintering psyche of a troubled Hollywood actress", and commented on Lynch's use of digital video, describing it as "the medium of home movies, viral video, and pornography—the everyday media detritus we associate more with ... intimate or private viewing experiences than communal ones", adding that the film "progresses with the darting, associative logic of hyperlinks". Scholar Anne Jerslev has argued that the film "constitutes multiple and fractured modes of perception in a world of digital screens". Other critics have argued that the film features "formal similarities with a website's hyperlinked layering of screens/windows, constantly disclosing new worlds from new points of view", but according to theorist Steven Shaviro "it also builds on cinematic codes, even as it deconstructs them". The scholar Delorme argues that the film is oriented around the issue of adultery, while "[t]he narrative is constructed on strange characters brought together by a similar terror".

Release and reception

Distribution and box office
The film was screened at several film festivals around the world, most notably the Venice Film Festival in Italy, New York Film Festival in New York, United States, the Thessaloniki Film Festival in Greece, Camerimage Film Festival in Poland, Fajr International Film Festival in Iran, International Film Festival Rotterdam in the Netherlands and the Festival Internacional de Cine Contemporáneo de la Ciudad de México in México City, Mexico.

Inland Empire was released and distributed by Ryko to the United States on 14 August 2007. It was released on 20 August in the United Kingdom, 4 October in Belgium and the Netherlands, with distribution by A-Film and 6 August 2008 in Australia, with distribution by Madman Entertainment.

518 Media released Inland Empire to two theaters in the United States on 6 December 2006, grossing a total of $27,508 over its opening weekend. It later expanded to its widest release of fifteen nationwide theaters, ultimately grossing $861,355 at the American box office. In other countries outside the United States, Inland Empire grossed $3,176,222, bringing the film's worldwide total gross to $4,037,577.

Critical reception
On review aggregator Rotten Tomatoes, the film has an approval rating of 71% based on 112 reviews, with an average score of 7.20/10. The website's critical consensus reads, "Typical David Lynch fare: fans of the director will find Inland Empire seductive and deep. All others will consider the heady surrealism impenetrable and pointless." On Metacritic, the film has a weighted average score of 73 out of 100, based on 24 critics, indicating "generally favorable reviews".

Manohla Dargis of The New York Times classified Inland Empire as "fitfully brilliant" after the New York Film Festival screening. Peter Travers, the film critic for Rolling Stone magazine wrote, "My advice, in the face of such hallucinatory brilliance, is that you hang on." The New Yorker was one of the few publications to offer any negative points about the film, calling it a "trenchant, nuanced film" that "quickly devolves into self-parody". Jonathan Ross, presenter of the BBC programme Film 2007, described it as "a work of genius ... I think". Damon Wise of Empire magazine gave it five stars, calling it "A dazzling and exquisitely original riddle as told by an enigma" and Jim Emerson (editor of RogerEbert.com) gave it 4 stars out of 4: "When people say Inland Empire is Lynch's Sunset Boulevard, Lynch's Persona or Lynch's 8½, they're quite right, but it also explicitly invokes connections to Stanley Kubrick's The Shining, Jean-Luc Godard's Pierrot le Fou, Buñuel and Dalí's Un Chien Andalou, Maya Deren's LA-experimental Meshes of the Afternoon (a Lynch favorite) and others". However, Carina Chocano of the Los Angeles Times wrote that "the film, which begins promisingly, disappears down so many rabbit holes (one of them involving actual rabbits) that eventually it just disappears for good".

Dern received near universal acclaim for her performance, with many reviews describing it as her finest to date. Lynch attempted to promote Dern's chances of an Academy Award for Best Actress nomination at the 2007 Academy Awards by campaigning with a live cow, though she was ultimately not nominated for the award.

Restoration by Janus Films
Inland Empire was restored and remastered by Janus Films in 2022, and was screened throughout the year beginning on April 8. The restoration of the film and soundtrack was overseen by David Lynch. For the restoration the original upscaled HD footage from the editing process was first downscaled back to standard definition to discard “false detail,” then converted to 4K using an AI upscaling algorithm.

Motion in the release might appear jittery to some since the original camcorder footage was shot in 60i on MiniDV tapes while the restoration is supposedly sourced from a HDCAM 24 frames per second master, meaning that there are 6 frames missing from every second of the film (12 frames when counting the field rate of interlaced source material).

Accolades

References

External links

2006 films
2006 independent films
2000s avant-garde and experimental films
American avant-garde and experimental films
French avant-garde and experimental films
American independent films
American mystery films
American nonlinear narrative films
Self-reflexive films
StudioCanal films
Films directed by David Lynch
Films about filmmaking
Films set in Los Angeles
Films shot in Poland
2000s English-language films
2000s Polish-language films
Films with screenplays by David Lynch
French independent films
Polish avant-garde and experimental films
Polish independent films
Films about actors
Films about nightmares
Camcorder films
2006 multilingual films
American multilingual films
French multilingual films
Polish multilingual films
Inland Empire
2000s American films
2000s French films